FC Liefering GmbH is an Austrian association football club, originally from Liefering, a section of Salzburg. It currently plays in the Second League, the second tier of Austrian football. Since 2012, Liefering has been a reserve team for Austrian Football Bundesliga side FC Red Bull Salzburg.

In December 2011 Red Bull Salzburg signed a cooperation with FC Pasching (Regionalliga Mitte) and USK Anif (Regionalliga West). The coach of the Juniors, Gerald Baumgartner, left Salzburg and became new coach of FC Pasching. Also players went to Pasching and Anif. After the 2011–12 season, the new coach Peter Hyballa left the club and became new head coach of SK Sturm Graz. Liefering's ongoing presence in the Erste Liga continues to create unrest, with average an attendance of under 500, many people believe the club is not good for the league. However the club promotes youth and has been a key factor in FC Red Bull Salzburg's 2016–17 UEFA Youth League side, who ultimately won the tournament.

Seasons
From the 2012–13 season the club, formerly known as USK Anif, changed its name to FC Liefering. Liefering are sometimes called Red Bull Liefering as they adapted the jerseys and team colors from Red Bull Salzburg and RB Leipzig. In the 2012–13 season they won the Regionalliga West and after two relegation matches they were promoted to the Austrian Football Second League.

They are the farm team of FC Red Bull Salzburg. They are not eligible for promotion. In their first year, they finished 3rd, in the 2014–15 season they finished 2nd.

In June 2015 coach Peter Zeidler left the team and became coach of FC Red Bull Salzburg. He was succeeded by Thomas Letsch, who also followed Zeidler to Salzburg for two matches after Zeidler was fired there.

As a feeder club the team fields very young players. In the next two seasons the average age of the team was under twenty years. Players like Samuel Tetteh or Gideon Mensah came to Salzburg from Ghana, other talented players came from the Red Bull Football Academy like Hannes Wolf or Luca Meisl.

In the 2016–17 season FC Red Bull Salzburg (U19) won the UEFA Youth League. Most of the players came from Liefering.

In the 2020–21 season Bo Svensson became coach of FC Liefering. In winter he went to Mainz 05 and Matthias Jaissle became coach of the team. At the end of the season he was promoted to FC Red Bull Salzburg as head coach. He followed Jesse Marsch, who went to RB Leipzig. The season was the most successful in history. The team ended as runner-up, only one scored goal behind the champion FC Blau-Weiß Linz.
After the season Kilian Schröcker, Fabian Windhager, Antonin Svoboda and Alexander Prass left the club.

In the 2021–22 season Rene Aufhauser, former assistant coach with FC Red Bull Salzburg, became new head coach of FC Liefering. He also is coach of the UEFA Youth League team of Red Bull Salzburg. After finishing 6th Aufhauser left the club.

For the 2022–23 season Fabio Ingolitsch, the coach of the U18 team became new headcoach of FC Liefering.

Honours
2. Liga
Runner up: 2015, 2017, 2021
Regionalliga West
Champions: 2012–13

Alpenliga
Champions: 1978–79*

Austrian Landesliga
Champions: 1988–89*

Salzburger Liga
Champions: 1988–89*, 1992–93*, 2002–03*, 2006–07*

1. Klasse Nord
Champions: 1965*, 1974*

2. Klasse B
Champions: 1950*

Salzburg Cup
Winners: 1978*

Salzburg Indoor Cup
Winners: 1990*, 2001*, 2002*, 2005*, 2009*

* as USK Anif

Current squad

Coaching staff

References

External links
FC Liefering page 

FC Red Bull Salzburg
1947 establishments in Austria
Association football clubs established in 1947
Football clubs in Austria
Red Bull sports teams
Sports in Salzburg